William Browder may refer to:
William Browder (mathematician) (born 1934), American mathematician
Bill Browder (born 1964), American-born British businessman, nephew of the above